Popular tourist attractions in Singapore include the following:

Beaches and bays

 East Coast Park
 Marina Bay
 Palawan Beach
 Siloso Beach
 Changi Beach

Cultural centres
 China Cultural Centre

Educational centres
 Science Centre Singapore
 Singapore Discovery Centre
 ArtScience Museum

Entertainment districts
 Boat Quay
 Clarke Quay

Hills
 Bukit Timah
 Mount Faber

Historical buildings
 Baba House
 City Hall
 Empress Place Building
 Fort Canning
 Fort Siloso
 House of Tan Yeok Nee
 Raffles Hotel
 Sri Temasek
 Sun Yat Sen Nanyang Memorial Hall
 Victoria Theatre and Concert Hall

Infrastructure
 Marina Barrage
 URA City Gallery

Islands

Museums

Nature
 Sungei Buloh Wetland Reserve

Parks

Religious places
 Thian Hock Keng
 Yueh Hai Ching Temple
 Hong San See
 Tan Si Chong Su or Poh Chiak Keng
 Kwan Im Thong Hood Cho Temple
 Burmese Buddhist Temple
 Wat Ananda Metyarama Thai Buddhist Temple
 Sri Lankaramaya Buddhist Temple
 Lian Shan Shuang Lin Monastery
 Kong Meng San Phor Kark See Monastery
 Foo Hai Ch'an Monastery
 Buddha Tooth Relic Temple and Museum
 Sri Thendayuthapani Temple
 Sri Mariamman Temple
 Armenian Church, Singapore
 Maghain Aboth Synagogue
 Sultan Mosque

Integrated resorts
 Marina Bay Sands
 Resorts World Sentosa

Rivers

Shopping centers

Shopping districts
 Arab Street
 Bugis Street
 Chinatown
 Little India
 Orchard Road

Sports
 National Stadium
 Singapore Indoor Stadium

Theaters
 Esplanade – Theatres on the Bay

Theme parks
 Haw Par Villa
 Adventure Cove
 Universal Studios Singapore
 Wild Wild Wet
 Merlion Park

Tours
 Royal Albatross
 Floral Heritage tours by Scentopia
 Singapore Ducktours

Trails
 Helix Bridge
 Southern Ridges

Zoos
 Jurong Bird Park
 Night Safari
 River Safari
 Singapore Zoo

See also
 Tourism in Singapore

References

Tourism in Singapore
Singapore